The Yukio Hatoyama Cabinet governed Japan from September 2009 to June 2010, following the landslide victory of the Democratic Party of Japan in the election on 30 August 2009. The election marked the first time in Japanese post-war history that voters delivered the control of the government to the opposition. The cabinet was also the first since Hata Cabinet in 1994 that included no members of the LDP.

Political background 
Yukio Hatoyama and the DPJ came into power after their historic victory in the 2009 general election. The DPJ won more than 300 House of Representatives seats in the election and inflicted the worst defeat for a sitting government in modern Japanese history to the LDP. Hatoyama entered office with high approval ratings amid high public expectations to recover the Great Recession-hit economy and reform Japan's stagnant politics. These high expectations contributed to a drop in popularity of the government. The government became more unpopular after it broke a campaign promise of closing down an American air base in Okinawa Prefecture. Hatoyama initially moved to close down the base after the election, but relented to the pressure from the American government. Hatoyama also cited the escalation of tension in the Korean Peninsula following the sinking of South Korean Navy corvette Cheonan as a factor that contributed to the base being kept. The continuous drop in the government's approval ratings led to Hatoyama's resignation on 2 June 2010.

During his short premiership, Hatoyama managed to pass a relatively significant amount of progressive reforms, including the introduction of new social benefits for families, a marked increase in the education budget, the abolition of public high school tuition fees and welfare expansion. Japan also developed a more Asia-focused policy and a warmer relations with China under Hatoyama, culminated with a visit by then-Vice President Xi Jinping to Tokyo in January 2010.

Election of the Prime Minister

Lists of ministers 

R = Member of the House of Representatives
C = Member of the House of Councillors

Cabinet

References

External links 
 List of Ministers of the Hatoyama Cabinet - Prime Minister's Office (Kantei)

Cabinet of Japan
2009 establishments in Japan
2010 disestablishments in Japan
Cabinets established in 2009
Cabinets disestablished in 2010